Peter Benjamin Golden (born 1941) is an American historian who is Professor Emeritus of History, Turkish and Middle Eastern Studies at Rutgers University. He has written many books and articles on Turkic and Central Asian Studies, such as An introduction to the history of the Turkic peoples. 

Golden grew up in New York and attended Music & Art High School. He graduated from CUNY Queens College in 1963, before obtaining his M.A. and Ph.D. in History from Columbia University in 1968 and 1970, respectively. Golden also studied at the Dil ve Tarih – Coğrafya Fakültesi (School of Language and History – Geography) in Ankara (1967–1968). He taught at Rutgers University from 1969 until his retirement in 2012. He was Director of the Middle Eastern Studies Program (2008–2011) at Rutgers. He is an honorary member of the Türk Dil Kurumu and Kőrösi Csoma Society of Hungarian Orientalists and was a member of the School of Historical Studies at the Institute for Advanced Study (Princeton) 2005–2006. In 2019, he was elected an Honorary Member of the Hungarian Academy of Sciences.

Works
(1980) Khazar studies: An Historico-philological Inquiry into the Origins of the Khazars, Budapest: Akadémiai Kiadó
(1992) An introduction to the history of the Turkic peoples: Ethnogenesis and state-formation in medieval and early modern Eurasia and the Middle East, Wiesbaden: Harrassowitz Verlag.
(1998) Nomads and sedentary societies in medieval Eurasia, Washington, D. C.: American Historical Association.
(2000) The King's Dictionary. The Rasulid Hexaglot: Fourteenth Century Vocabularies in Arabic, Persian, Turkic, Greek, Armenian and Mongol, Leiden: Brill Publishers. (Book, Edited, Vol. 4 in the series Handbuch der Orientalistik, 8. Abteilung Zentralasien)
(2003) Nomads and their Neighbours in the Russian Steppe. Turks, Khazars and Qipchaqs, Aldershot, UK: Ashgate Publishing.
 
(2007) The World of the Khazars: New Perspectives, co-edited with H. Ben-Shammai and A. Róna-Tas. Leiden: Brill Publishers.
(2009) The Cambridge History of Inner Asia: The Chinggisid Age, co-edited with N. Di Cosmo, A.J. Frank, Cambridge: Cambridge University Press.
(2010) Turks and Khazars: Origins, Institutions, and Interactions in Pre-Mongol Eurasia, Aldershot, UK: Ashgate Publishing.
(2011) Studies on the Peoples and Cultures of the Eurasian Steppes, Bucharest–Brăila: Editura Academiei Române – Muzeul Brăilei Editura Istros
(2011) Central Asia in World History, Oxford-New York: Oxford University Press.

Festschrift

See also
 Euro-Asian Steppe

References

External links
Rutgers faculty website
Curriculum vitae

Living people
21st-century American historians
American male non-fiction writers
American Turkologists
Khazar studies
Historians of Central Asia
1941 births
21st-century American male writers